The Technical Support Working Group (TSWG) is a United States Interagency program for research and development into combating terrorism measures. Established in 1986, TSWG falls under the oversight of the Assistant Secretary of Defense for Special Operations/Low-Intensity Conflict (ASD SO/LIC) and derives some authorities for international work from the Coordinator for Counterterrorism at the Department of State.

TSWG is organized into several subgroups and has representatives from more than 50 federal organizations. It addresses R&D requirement in various application and technology areas including:

 Advanced Analytics 
 Chemical, Biological, Radiological, Nuclear, and Explosives
 Expeditionary Force Protection
 Explosive Ordnance Disposal and Explosive Operations
 Forensic Exploitation and Identity Operations
 Human Performance and Training
 Indirect Influence and Competition
 Protection, Survivability, and Recovery
 Surveillance, Collection, and Operations Support
 Tactical Offensive Support

TSWG is a key sponsor of the Global Security Challenge at London Business School

TSWG was credited with helping save lives in the September 11 attacks on The Pentagon.  Following the 1998 United States embassy bombings, TSWG conducted research into improved blast-resistant structures and windows, some of which was incorporated into the recently renovated part of the Pentagon which was hit by the attack.

See also
 Bureau of Counterterrorism 
 Bureau of Diplomatic Security
 Interagency Training Center

References

External links
 TSWG/IWTSD

United States Department of State agencies